Emrick is both a surname and a given name. Notable people with the name include:

Joe Emrick, American politician
Mike Emrick, (born 1946), American sports commentator
George Emrick Harris (1827–1911), American politician
Doris Emrick Lee (1905–1983), American painter
Keller Emrick Rockey (1888–1970), United States Marine Corps general

Fictional characters
Julie Emrick, a character in the television series Felicity

See also
Demrick
Emerick
Eric